Aku Titipkan Cinta is an Indonesian television drama series produced by Tobali Putra Production which aired on 27 June 2022 on ANTV replacing Terpaksa menikahi Tuan Muda. It stars Citra Kirana and Rezky Adhitya in the lead role.

The series went off air on 16 August 2022 due to low ratings. The show was replaced by Annaya from 18 August 2022.

Plot 
Fate brings together Khanza (Citra Kirana) and Zaki (Rezky Adhitya), Zaki must pretend to be a home-based tempe factory worker owned by Khanza's father (Barry Prima) in order to persuade the residents to sell their land for the construction of an apartment owned by his company.

Gradually over time the seeds of love between the two began to grow. However, the presence of Salman (Arief Fadhillah), Zaki's half-brother and Bebi (Michelle Joan), the half-sister of Khanza, adds to the twists and turns of the story in their lives.

Will fate unite Zaki to Khanza? And what if Khanza finds out that Zaki is the son of a businessman who has made the Khanza family suffer?

Cast

Main
Rezky Aditya as Zaki Adinata: Khanza's husband; Haikal and Mira's son; Eliza's step-son.
Citra Kirana as Khanza Kirana: Zaki's wife; Sofid and Sarah's daughter; Bebi's half-sister.

Recurring
Ari Wibowo as Haikal Adinata: Zaki's father; Salman's step-father; Mira's ex-husband; Eliza's husband; Rossi's brother.
Barry Prima as H. Sofid: Sarah's husband; Khanza and Bebi's father.
Ira Wibowo as Rossi Adinata: Haikal's sister; Farel's mother.
Puspita Sari as Eliza: Marco's first wife; Haikal's second wife; Zaki's step-mother; Salman's mother.
Michelle Joan as Bebi: Khanza's half-sister; Sofid's half-daughter; Salman's former obsessive lover; Farel's love interest.
Zikri Daulay as Farel Adinata: Zaki's personal assistant; Rossi's son; Bebi's love interest.
Tabah Penemuan as Marco: Eliza's ex-husband; Salman's father. (Dead)
Arief Fadhillah as Salman Prasetya: Zaki's half-brother; Marco and Eliza's son.
Mentari de Marelle as Rachel Wijaya: Zaki's ex-fiancée.
Intan Mita as Sumi: Adinata's maid.
Mehnaz Marinez as Mira Adinata: Haikal's ex-wife; Zaki's mother. (Dead)
Gessy Selvia as Sarah: Sofid's wife; Khanza and Bebi's mother. (Dead)

Production

Development
This series was first titled Cinta CEO di Langit Istiqlal and changed to Aku Titipkan Cinta. The first promo of this series was released on 10 June 2022.

Casting 
Rezky Adhitya to play the male lead, Zaki Adinata and the female lead Khanza, signed by Citra Kirana. The show marks the second collaboration between Adhitya and Kirana as they previously co-starred in Istri Tercinta (2020). This series is the reunion of actor Ari Wibowo and actress Ira Wibowo after 30 years. Michelle Joan was chosen to play Bebi.

Reception 
In the first episode, is in nineteen place with TVR 1.7 and audience share 9.4%.

Awards and nominations

References

Indonesian drama television series
Indonesian television soap operas